Lagrelius Point is a low, ice-free point on the northwest side of James Ross Island, Antarctica,  south of Carlson Island. It was discovered and first surveyed in 1903 by the Swedish Antarctic Expedition under Otto Nordenskiöld. He named it Cape Lagrelius after Axel Lagrelius of Stockholm, who had contributed toward the cost of the expedition. It was resurveyed by the Falkland Islands Dependencies Survey in 1952; "point" is now considered a more suitable descriptive term for this feature than "cape".

References

Headlands of James Ross Island